Tac/Scan (夕ック/スキャン) is a space combat shooter released as an arcade video game in 1982. It was developed by Sega Electronics (formerly Gremlin Industries) and published by Sega. An Atari 2600 version was released in 1983. 

The game uses 3D vector graphics that switch between overhead and third-person perspectives. The player commands seven units in squadron formation through waves of attacking enemies; the player can gain reserve units, while being able to command the units to perform various actions, including firing at enemies, getting into formation, or a "tac" maneuver.

Tac/Scan is an unlockable game in the PlayStation 2 version of Sega Genesis Collection.

Gameplay

The game starts with seven individual ships in play. Those ships can be lost in any of the three stages by hitting a tunnel, getting shot, or colliding with an enemy, the laser-firing Ahmins composing the superfleet from the planet of Ahm. The player is able to "collect" and earn these ships back as the game progresses. The squadron can drop down to one ship in the game, but still have four "back-up" ships. If the final ship in play is lost, however, the game is over (even if the player has unused "back-up" ships). This is different from other games that give the player ships sequentially.

In the first stage, the player pilots their ships through waves of attacking enemies. The player can either fire upon them, or "tac" their ships around them. The second stage is much like the first, except that it is from a 3-D third-person perspective from behind the player's ships. In the third stage, the player pilots their ships down a space warp tunnel, and will lose any ships that touch the side of the tunnel.

Reception 
In Japan, Game Machine listed Tac/Scan on their July 1, 1983 issue as being the twenty-second most-successful table arcade unit of the month.

References

External links 
Tac/Scan at Arcade History

1982 video games
Arcade video games
Vector arcade video games
Atari 2600 games
Gremlin Industries games
Sega arcade games
Shooter video games
Video games developed in the United States